State Trunk Highway 110 (often called Highway 110, STH-110 or WIS 110) is a state highway in the US state of Wisconsin. It runs north–south in central Wisconsin from Fremont to Marion. Its southern terminus is at US Highway 10 (US 10) and WIS 96 southeast of Fremont; its northern terminus is at US 45 in Marion.

Route description

The highway begins at an intersection with US 10 and WIS 96 southeast of Fremont. It heads north from US 10 for about half a mile before turning westward. It passes through Fremont and heads to the northwest before turning to the south toward US 10 and WIS 49.

It then splits off and heads northward into Weyauwega. After it leaves the city, the highway continues to the northwest, where it will meet with WIS 22 and WIS 54. It runs concurrently to the north along both highways before WIS 54 splits off. WIS 110 and WIS 54 continue concurrently northward, passing through Manawa. North of Manawa, the highways split and WIS 110 continues to the north. Further along, it enters Marion, where it terminates at US 45.

History

In 1925, the original proposed number for a United States Numbered Highway to run from Oshkosh to Fremont, Wisconsin, was U.S. Route 112. However, the number approved for the route in 1926 was U.S. Route 110 (US 110).

The southern terminus of the route was at US 41 (now the intersection of US 45 and WIS 76) in Oshkosh. The northern terminus was at US 10 (now the northern terminus of the WIS 96/WIS 110 concurrency) east of Fremont.

US 110 was deleted in 1939 and subsequently replaced with WIS 110. Due to a series of extensions and truncations in the 70 years since, however, WIS 110 is no longer designated on most of the former routing of US 110. Today, what was once US 110 is now US 45 from Oshkosh to Winchester, CTH-II from Winchester to US 10 southeast of Fremont, and WIS 110 from US 10 to WIS 96 east of Fremont.

Major intersections

See also

Notes

References

External links

 Endpoints of historic U.S. Highway 110

110
1
Transportation in Waupaca County, Wisconsin
Transportation in Shawano County, Wisconsin